Podgor is a village in the Crmnica region of Montenegro. It is best known as the birthplace of the celebrated Yugoslav communist politician Svetozar Vukmanović-Tempo, who was born there in 1912.

Bar Municipality